is a Japanese footballer currently playing as a midfielder for Matsumoto Yamaga.

Career statistics

Club
.

Notes

References

External links

2001 births
Living people
Sportspeople from Shiga Prefecture
Association football people from Shiga Prefecture
Japanese footballers
Association football midfielders
J2 League players
Matsumoto Yamaga FC players
21st-century Japanese people